Fairy Cup may refer to:

The object in Fairy cup legends
Fungi
Humaria hemisphaerica, or "hairy fairy cup", or "brown-haired fairy cup"
Bisporella citrina, or "yellow fairy cups"
Peziza praetervisa, or "purple fairy cup"
Peziza violacea, or "violet fairy cup"
Any of the lichenized fungi of the genus Xanthoria

See also
Elf Cup (disambiguation)
Faerie cake
Pixie cup